Daniel Woodhouse Lloyd (born 4 March 1992) is a British racing car driver and the 2009 champion of the Renault Clio UK Winter Cup.

Lloyd was born in Huddersfield.  After competing in the Skip Barber National Championship in the first half of 2010, he made his début in the British Touring Car Championship at Croft.
In 2011 he raced in the Volkswagen Scirocco R-Cup, qualifying on pole in his debut race and eventually scored two victories and finished third in the championship.

For 2012, he raced in the Porsche Carrera Cup Great Britain series with Team Parker Racing and scored his first victory in round 6 in the monsoon conditions at Thruxton, just beating rival Glynn Geddie.

Lloyd was the inaugural TCR UK champion, taking the title in a Volkswagen Golf run by WestCoast Racing.

Lloyd will compete in the 2022 British Touring Car Championship with Excelr8 Motorsport.

Racing record

Complete British Touring Car Championship results

(key) (Races in bold indicate pole position – 1 point awarded just in first race; races in italics indicate fastest lap – 1 point awarded all races; * signifies that driver led race for at least one lap – 1 point given all races)

Complete Blancpain Sprint Series results

Complete TCR International Series results
(key) (Races in bold indicate pole position) (Races in italics indicate fastest lap)

Complete TCR Europe Touring Car Series results
(key) (Races in bold indicate pole position) (Races in italics indicate fastest lap)

Complete TCR UK Touring Car Championship results
(key) (Races in bold indicate pole position) (Races in italics indicate fastest lap)

Complete TCR China Touring Car Championship results
(key) (Races in bold indicate pole position) (Races in italics indicate fastest lap)

Complete TCR Malaysia Touring Car Championship results
(key) (Races in bold indicate pole position) (Races in italics indicate fastest lap)

References

External links
 Official website
 Career statistics from Driver Database

1992 births
Living people
English racing drivers
British Touring Car Championship drivers
Sportspeople from Huddersfield
Porsche Supercup drivers
Blancpain Endurance Series drivers
24 Hours of Spa drivers
British GT Championship drivers
Porsche Carrera Cup GB drivers
24H Series drivers
Renault UK Clio Cup drivers
Ginetta Junior Championship drivers